Arthur Jeffrey Tarnow (February 3, 1942 – January 21, 2022) was an American jurist who served as a United States district judge of the United States District Court for the Eastern District of Michigan.

Early life and career
Tarnow was born in Detroit, Michigan, on February 3, 1942. He received a Bachelor of Arts degree from Wayne State University in 1963 and a Juris Doctor from Wayne State University Law School in 1965. He was a law clerk to John Fitzgerald, Louis McGregor, and Timothy Quinn of the Michigan Court of Appeals in 1967. He was a lecturer at the University of Papua New Guinea from 1967 to 1968. He was a chief deputy defender for Legal Aid and Defenders from 1969 to 1970. He was an attorney for the Michigan State Appellate Defender Office from 1970 to 1972. He was in private practice of law in Michigan from 1973 to 1998.

Federal judicial service

On September 24, 1997, Tarnow was nominated by President Bill Clinton to a seat on the United States District Court for the Eastern District of Michigan vacated by Julian Abele Cook Jr. Tarnow was confirmed by the United States Senate on May 13, 1998, and received his commission on May 22, 1998. He assumed senior status on May 26, 2010.

Death
Tarnow died from heart disease at Henry Ford Hospital in Detroit on January 21, 2022, at the age of 79.

References

Notes

Citations

Sources

1942 births
2022 deaths
20th-century American judges
21st-century American judges
Judges of the United States District Court for the Eastern District of Michigan
Lawyers from Detroit
United States district court judges appointed by Bill Clinton
Academic staff of the University of Papua New Guinea
Wayne State University alumni
Wayne State University Law School alumni